The Mosque of the Turks, also known as Jemaa ettrouk, is a Tunisian historical mosque located in the center of Houmt Essouk in the island of Djerba.

Location 

The mosque is located in Houmt Essouk, in front of the cultural center Ferid Ghazi and behind Saint Joseph Church, in what used to be the Maltese neighborhood.

History 
It was built during the 16th century following the orders of caïd Ghazi Mustapha Bey. It was restored many times and eventually classified as a national historical monument.

Architecture 

The monument is small in size in comparison to other mosques. It has a sober architecture with white walls and a unique minaret. It has a big courtyard and large cistern to collect rainwater.

Rite 
In the beginning, the mosque was the only one that followed the hanafi rite, a rite of the royal family, the court and some Turkish families on the island. Later, this was converted to the maliki rite.

Gallery

References 

 
Mosques in Tunisia
Medenine Governorate